Michael Robert Lundin (born September 24, 1984) is an American professional ice hockey player, who is currently an unrestricted free agent. He has previously played in the National Hockey League (NHL) with the Ottawa Senators, Minnesota Wild, and Tampa Bay Lightning.

Early life
Lundin was born in Burnsville, Minnesota, and attended Apple Valley High School (Minnesota) in Apple Valley, Minnesota, where he grew up. He graduated from the University of Maine. Lundin was a finalist for Minnesota Mr. Hockey award and earned All-Conference honors in both hockey and baseball. He was named the 2003 Associated Press’ Minnesota Hockey Player of the Year and Minnesota Star-Tribune Metro Hockey Player of the Year.

Playing career

Lundin was drafted in the fourth round, 102nd overall selection, by the Tampa Bay Lightning in the 2004 NHL Entry Draft.

On July 9, 2011, Lundin signed a one-year, $1 million contract with the Minnesota Wild. During the 2011–12 season, due to injury and limited impact Lundin appeared in only 17 games with the Wild, registering 2 assists. He also made a brief appearance in rehabilitation for the Wild's AHL affiliate, the Houston Aeros.

On July 1, 2012, Lundin left the Wild organization and signed as a free agent to a one-year deal with the Ottawa Senators. He played in just 11 games with the Senators during the lockout-shortened 2012-13 season, recording a single assist as he battled various injuries.

On June 11, 2013, Lundin signed with Barys Astana of the Kontinental Hockey League, according to the team's website. He spent three years there.

On August 24, 2016, Lundin agreed to a one-year contract with EHC Biel of the National League A (NLA).

On April 27, 2017, Lundin signed a two-year deal with Jokerit of the KHL. Lundin had previously played in the KHL from 2013 to 2016. Lundin was limited through injury to just 23 games in the 2017–18 season.

Prior to his second season with Jokerit, Lundin announced he would not play the season due to continuing injury issues, effectively ending his tenure with the club.

Career statistics

Regular season and playoffs

International

Awards and honors

References

External links

1984 births
Almtuna IS players
American men's ice hockey defensemen
American people of Swedish descent
Barys Nur-Sultan players
EHC Biel players
Houston Aeros (1994–2013) players
Ice hockey players from Minnesota
Jokerit players
Living people
Maine Black Bears men's ice hockey players
Minnesota Wild players
Norfolk Admirals players
Ottawa Senators players
People from Burnsville, Minnesota
People from Apple Valley, Minnesota
Tampa Bay Lightning draft picks
Tampa Bay Lightning players
Apple Valley High School (Minnesota) alumni